Simon Max Butler (born 2 October 1984) is a former English first-class cricketer.

Born at High Wycombe, Butler attended Cardiff University, where he played minor matches for Cardiff UCCE. In one such match against Leeds/Bradford UCCE in 2007, Butler scored 167, which was the highest score that year by a university batsman. In that same year, Butler made two appearances in first-class cricket for the Marylebone Cricket Club against the touring West Indians at Durham, and Sri Lanka A at Arundel. He scored a total of 36 runs in these matches, as well as taking 5 wickets. He played Second XI cricket for Middlesex, Leicestershire, and Nottinghamshire, but was unable to force his way into their starting elevens. He also played Hawke Cup cricket in New Zealand for North Otago in later 2008 and early 2009.

References

External links

1984 births
Living people
Sportspeople from High Wycombe
Alumni of Cardiff University
English cricketers
Marylebone Cricket Club cricketers